The 2008 United States presidential election in South Dakota took place on November 4, 2008, and was part of the 2008 United States presidential election. Voters chose three representatives, or electors to the Electoral College, who voted for president and vice president.

South Dakota was won by Republican nominee John McCain by an 8.4 point margin of victory. Prior to the election, 16 of 17 news organizations considered this a state McCain would win, or otherwise considered as a red state. Like the other states located in the Great Plains region, South Dakota is a predominantly rural and sparsely populated state with conservative voting tendencies which favors the Republicans, who dominate elections at the state and federal level. Although South Dakota stayed in the GOP column in 2008 as Republican John McCain carried the state with 53.16% of the popular vote, Obama greatly improved upon John Kerry's performance from four years earlier. This is the last time a Democrat won more than 40% of the vote in South Dakota, the last time the victory margin was within single digits, and the last time the state voted to the left of Texas. This is also the first election since 1912 in which South Dakota didn't support the same candidate as Indiana.

Primaries
 2008 South Dakota Republican presidential primary
 2008 South Dakota Democratic presidential primary

Campaign

Predictions
There were 16 news organizations who made state-by-state predictions of the election. Here are their last predictions before election day:

Polling

McCain won two pre-election polls, and never polled less than 47%. The highest Obama ever polled was 50%; the final poll showed McCain leading 50% to 42%.

Fundraising
John McCain raised a total of $287,533 in the state. Barack Obama raised $337,053.

Advertising and visits
Obama and his interest groups spent $639,435. McCain and his interest groups spent just $1,531. Obama did not visit the state, while McCain visited once, going to Sturgis.

Analysis
South Dakota, a predominantly Republican state, has not voted for a Democratic presidential nominee since Lyndon B. Johnson won the state in the landslide election of 1964. A sparsely populated state whose population largely tends towards a rural and conservative lifestyle, the state has been won handily by the Republicans in every election since then.

McCain was able to keep South Dakota in the GOP column in 2008, taking in 53.16% of the total statewide vote over Obama who received 44.75%, an 8.41-percent margin of victory. This margin of victory was considerably smaller compared to 2004 when George W. Bush carried South Dakota with 59.91% of the vote over John Kerry who received 38.44%, a 21.47% margin of victory, resulting in a 13.06% swing to the Democrats in 2008.

While McCain did well throughout the state, his main strength was in Western South Dakota, where he often won by landslide margins. He was able to carry Pennington County, which contains the state's second largest city of Rapid City. In contrast, Obama ran best in Eastern South Dakota, losing most counties by fairly close margins. He also did well among Native Americans; in Western South Dakota, the only counties Obama won were majority Native American.

Obama was able to substantially improve upon John Kerry's showing in South Dakota in 2004 by a number of factors. First, it helped that South Dakota received media attention during the course of the 2008 Democratic Primary, being the last state to vote in the historic and contentious primary that gave Hillary Rodham Clinton an 11-point victory over Obama; it was Clinton's last victory in the primary. In the general election, Obama was able to cut the margin significantly by narrowly carrying Minnehaha County, which contains the state's largest city of Sioux Falls. He was also able to win Brown County, which contains Aberdeen, as well as Brookings County which contains Brookings, home of South Dakota State University. He did much better than Kerry in Eastern South Dakota, which is where most of the people live, but McCain's margins throughout the state were too large to overcome.

During the same election, incumbent Democratic U.S. Senator Tim Johnson was soundly reelected over Republican State Senator Jim Dykstra by a two-to-one margin, receiving 62.49% of the vote to Dykstra's 37.51%. At the state level, Democrats made gains in the South Dakota Legislature, picking up four seats in the South Dakota House of Representatives.

, this is the last election in which Brown County, Lake County, Miner County, Minnehaha County, Moody County, and Brookings County voted for a Democratic presidential candidate.

Results

Results by county

Counties that flipped from Republican to Democratic
 Brookings (largest city: Brookings)
 Brown (largest city: Aberdeen)
 Lake (largest city: Madison)
 Marshall (largest city: Britton)
 Miner (largest city: Howard)
 Minnehaha (largest city: Sioux Falls)
 Moody (largest city: Flandreau)

By congressional district
South Dakota has only one congressional district because of its small population compared to other states. This district, called the At-Large district because it covers the entire state, is equivalent to the statewide election results.

Electors

Technically the voters of South Dakota cast their ballots for electors, representatives to the Electoral College. The state is allocated three electors because it has one congressional district and 2 senators. All candidates who appear on the ballot or qualify to receive write-in votes must submit a list of three electors, who pledge to vote for their candidate and the candidate's running mate. In the state's First Past the Post (plurality voting) system, the winner of a plurality of votes in the state is awarded all three electoral votes. Their chosen electors then vote for president and vice president. Although electors are pledged to their candidate and running mate, they are not obligated to vote for them. An elector who votes for someone other than his or her candidate is known as a faithless elector.

The electors of each state and the District of Columbia met on December 15, 2008, to cast their votes for president and vice president. The Electoral College itself never meets as one body. Instead the electors from each state and the District of Columbia met in their respective capitals.

The following were the members of the Electoral College from the state. All 3 were pledged to John McCain and Sarah Palin:
Mike Rounds
Dennis Daugaard
Larry Long

See also
 Presidency of Barack Obama
 United States presidential elections in South Dakota

References

South Dakota
2008
Presidential